Matchless (also known as Mission Top Secret) is a 1967 Italian science fiction-comedy film directed by Alberto Lattuada. It parodies the spy film genre.

Cast 
 Patrick O'Neal as Perry 'Matchless' Liston
 Princess Ira von Fürstenberg as Arabella
 Donald Pleasence as Gregori Andreanu
 Henry Silva as Hank Norris
 Nicoletta Machiavelli as Tipsy
 Sorrell Booke as Colonel Coolpepper
 Howard St. John as General Shapiro
 Jacques Herlin as O-Chin's Doctor

Reception
In a contemporary review, Variety stated that "if audiences are not yet satiated with spy spoofs, United Artists' Matchless may get an appreciative reception from the action market." The review noted that "the film doesn't take itself too seriously and makes some clever gibes at the expense of military and intelligence powers of all nationalities", but that "uneven acting and technical credits hamper the film's chances of rising above programmer status."

References

Sources

External links

1967 films
1960s parody films
1960s spy comedy films
Commedia all'italiana
Italian science fiction comedy films
Italian spy comedy films
Films directed by Alberto Lattuada
Films scored by Ennio Morricone
1960s science fiction comedy films
Cold War spy films
Italian parody films
Films about invisibility
Films produced by Dino De Laurentiis
Films set in Hamburg
Films set in West Germany
Films set in China
1967 comedy films
English-language Italian films
1960s English-language films
1960s Italian films